Iran competed at the 2014 Summer Youth Olympics, in Nanjing, China from 16 August to 28 August 2014.

Competitors

Medal summary

Medal table

Medalists

Results by event

Aquatics

Swimming

Boys

Athletics

Boys

Mixed

Beach volleyball

Boys

Equestrian

Jumping

Judo

Boys

Shooting

Girls

Mixed

Taekwondo

Boys

Girls

Weightlifting

Boys

Wrestling

Boys' Greco-Roman

References

2014 in Iranian sport
Nations at the 2014 Summer Youth Olympics
Youth